Howard Street may refer to:

Howard Street (Baltimore), a major street in Downtown Baltimore, Maryland
Howard Street Tunnel fire, a disaster that struck the freight railroad tunnel under Baltimore's Howard Street in 2001
Howard Street (Sheffield), a short street in Sheffield, England
Howard Street (Chicago), a major street in the Chicago metropolitan area
Howard Street Apartment District in Omaha, Nebraska
Howard Street, London, a demolished street in London
Howard Street (San Francisco), a street in Soma and the Mission districts of San Francisco

Howard Street (novel), by Nathan Heard, 1968